Pushcart may refer to:

 A cart that is pushed by one or more persons:
 Baggage cart
 Food cart
 Pastry cart, for serving pastry
 Tea cart, also named teacart, tea trolley and tea wagon, for serving tea or other drinks
 Rail push trolley
 Pushcart Press
 Pushcart Prize
 The Pushcart War, a 1964 children's book by Jean Merrill